Tommaso Berni (born 6 March 1983) is a retired Italian professional footballer who last played as a goalkeeper for Inter Milan.

Club career

Early career
Berni started his career at Fiorentina. In 1998, he joined Inter Milan. He was a backup goalkeeper for their Primavera youth team in 2001 Torneo di Viareggio. Marco Varaldi was the starting keeper.

In March 2001, Berni moved to England, joining Wimbledon, but never made a first team appearance. He was released on 30 June 2003.

In mid-2003, he joined Ternana in Serie B.

Lazio
Berni left for Lazio in mid-2006 on a temporary deal as Ternana was relegated to 2006–07 Serie C1. Just before the January transfer window closed, Lazio bought his full ownership for €1.5 million from Ternana, as Lazio needed a backup goalkeeper due to Angelo Peruzzi set to leave and Marco Ballotta's advancing years. He signed a contract with Lazio which lasted until June 2011.

He made his Serie A debut on 20 May 2007 against Parma, the 37th match day of the season as Lazio had already qualified for 2007–08 UEFA Champions League third qualifying round. In 2007–08 season, Berni was the third-choice keeper behind Marco Ballotta and new signing Fernando Muslera. When Juan Pablo Carrizo was signed by Lazio in June 2008, Berni was loaned to Salernitana of Serie B to seek first team football in February 2009. Since arrived at Salernitana, he displaced Salvatore Pinna to the bench.

SC Braga
On 29 June 2011, Portuguese club S.C. Braga signed Berni on a free transfer.

Sampdoria
On 24 August 2012, Berni joined Serie A club Sampdoria after one season at Braga.

Inter Milan
On 2 July 2014, Berni returned to Inter Milan on a one-year contract,and played 30 games. as one of the four homegrown players of Inter in 2014–15 UEFA Europa League. However, he was not eligible as a youth product of Inter, as he only spent less than 3 years in the youth system of Inter.

On 3 June 2015, Tommaso agreed to extend his contract by 12 months. He was offered a one-year contract again on 1 July 2016, as one of the four homegrown players in 2016–17 UEFA Europa League. However, he was not registered in Serie A, as the regulation allowed to replace one keeper with another on the list, in case of emergency. Due to not on the list since September, Berni still received call-up from the coach for Serie A matches, but never appeared on the bench. Juan Pablo Carrizo was the second keeper instead in domestic match since September. After 5 days as free agent, on 5 July 2017, Berni signed a new one-year contract again. With his contract set to expire on 30 June, Berni would again sign a one-year contract extension to keep him at Inter until 30 June 2019. He signed another 1-year contract on 28 June 2019. He also got 2 red cards despite 0 appearances in 6 years.

He was released by Inter at the end of 2019–20 season and formally retired a week after.

International career
Berni has been capped by the Italian youth teams, from as young as the U16's to the U21 side and finished runners-up with the Italian U20 team at the Toulon Tournament in 2002 and 2003. He received two caps for the Italy U17 side (called U16 team until 2001) at the 2000 UEFA European Under-16 Football Championship qualification and Italy U19 side at the 2002 UEFA European Under-19 Football Championship that reached the third qualifying round. He made one appearance in the 2006 UEFA European Under-21 Football Championship qualification.

Career statistics

Club

References

External links

FIGC Nation Team statistics archive 
Berni fecha a baliza (Record) 
Braga, ufficiale: preso Tommaso Berni 

Italian footballers
Italy under-21 international footballers
Italy youth international footballers
Italian expatriate footballers
Inter Milan players
Wimbledon F.C. players
Ternana Calcio players
S.S. Lazio players
U.S. Salernitana 1919 players
S.C. Braga players
U.C. Sampdoria players
Torino F.C. players
Serie A players
Serie B players
Primeira Liga players
Expatriate footballers in England
Expatriate footballers in Portugal
Italian expatriate sportspeople in Portugal
Association football goalkeepers
Footballers from Florence
1983 births
Living people